Dagfinn Nilsen (30 April 1920 – 8 August 1998) was a Norwegian footballer. He played in one match for the Norway national football team in 1952. He was also part of Norway's squad for the 1952 Summer Olympics, but he did not play in any matches.

References

External links
 

1920 births
1998 deaths
Norwegian footballers
Norway international footballers
Place of birth missing
Association football midfielders
Odds BK players